Solanum tepuiense is a plant species native to Venezuela. It is known from one collection, from a low-elevation sandstone flat-topped mountain named Sororopán-Tepuí, near the Gran Sabana Region in the State of Bolívar in the eastern part of the country.

Solanum tepuiense is a shrub up to 2.5 m tall. Leaves are elliptic, thick and leathery, green and shiny on the upper surface, a few small hairs on the underside; blade up to  14 cm long. Inflorescences are opposite the leaves, each with 10-14 flowers. Flowers are white, about 20 mm in diameter. Fruit is a dry berry about 1.5 cm in diameter. Seeds are reddish-brown, flattened and kidney-shaped.

References

tepuiense
Endemic flora of Venezuela
Flora of the Tepuis